William Connor (1909–1967) was a British journalist.

William Connor may also refer to:

William D. Connor (1864–1944), Lieutenant-Governor of Wisconsin
William C. Connor (1832–?), Irish soldier and Medal of Honor recipient
William Connor (gymnast) (born 1870), British Olympic gymnast
William Herbert Connor (1895–?), salesman and political figure in Ontario
William Connor, a character from Twilight Zone: The Movie
William Durward Connor (1874–1960), U.S. Army general 
William E. Connor II, American-born, Hong Kong-based businessman and car collector
Bill Connor (American football) (1899–1980), American football player
Bill Connor (trade unionist) (born 1941), British trade unionist and politician

See also
William Conner (disambiguation)
William O'Connor (disambiguation)
William Connors (disambiguation)